The Most Dangerous Game is a 1932 American pre-Code horror film, directed by Ernest B. Schoedsack and Irving Pichel, starring Joel McCrea, Fay Wray and Leslie Banks.

The movie is an adaptation of the 1924 short story of the same name by Richard Connell; it is the first film version of the story. 

The plot concerns a big game hunter who deliberately strands a group of luxury yacht passengers on a remote island where he can hunt them for sport.

Plot
In 1932, a luxury yacht is sailing through a channel off the north-eastern coast of South America. Among the passengers is big game hunter and author Robert "Bob" Rainsford.  In discussing the sport with other passengers, Bob is asked if he would exchange places with the animals he hunts. After the yacht's owner disregards the captain's concerns about the channel lights not matching the charts, the ship runs aground, takes on water and explodes. 

Ultimately, Bob is the lone survivor, able to swim ashore to a small island nearby. He notices the channel lights off the shoreline change, and suspects the ship was deliberately led off course to its doom. Bob stumbles across a chateau where he becomes the guest of the expatriate Russian Count Zaroff, a fellow hunting enthusiast, who is familiar with Bob and his writings. Zaroff says four other earlier shipwrecked survivors are also his guests: Eve Trowbridge, her alcoholic brother Martin, and two sailors.

Later, Zaroff introduces Bob to the Trowbridges, and tells them his obsession with hunting became boring until he discovered "the most dangerous game" on the island.  Bob doesn't understand Zaroff, who fails to explain further. Eve is suspicious of Zaroff and tells Bob the two sailors that survived with them have not been seen since each visited Zaroff's trophy room. During the night, when Martin also vanishes, Eve and Bob go to the trophy room where they find the "trophies" are human heads. Zaroff appears with Martin's body. Now realizing what prey Zaroff hunts, Bob calls him a madman and is restrained. Bob refuses Zaroff's offer to join him in hunting humans, and Zaroff tells Bob he must be the next prey. Like those before him, Bob will be turned loose at dawn, given a hunting knife and some provisions and allowed the entire day to roam the island until midnight, when Zaroff will begin his hunt. If Bob survives until 4 a.m., then Bob "wins" the game and Zaroff will give him keys to his boathouse so he can leave the island. Zaroff then says he has never lost what he terms "outdoor chess."

Eve decides to go with Bob, and Zaroff tells Eve he will not hunt her since she is a woman; but, if Bob loses, she must return with him. The pair spend most of the day setting a trap for Zaroff. But, when the hunt begins, Zaroff discovers the trap and begins a cat and mouse pursuit of Bob. Eventually, Bob and Eve are trapped by a waterfall. When Bob is attacked by a hunting dog, Zaroff fires a shot with his rifle; both Bob and the dog fall off the cliff into the water below. Presuming Bob is dead, Zaroff takes Eve back to his fortress to enjoy his prize. However, to Zaroff's surprise, Bob returns to the chalet, explaining that the dog was shot, not he. Zaroff admits defeat and presents the key to the boathouse, but Bob discovers him holding a gun behind his back. Bob first fights Zaroff, then his henchmen, killing the henchmen and mortally wounding Zaroff. As Bob and Eve speed away in the motor boat, the dying Zaroff tries to shoot them from a window with his bow. Unsuccessful, he succumbs to his wounds and falls into the pack of his frenzied hunting dogs below, implying that he has now become their “prey”.

Cast

Production

The Most Dangerous Game was filmed at night on the same sets used in King Kong (1933) with four of the same actors, Fay Wray, Robert Armstrong, James Flavin and Noble Johnson.

The producing team included Ernest B. Schoedsack and Merian C. Cooper, co-directors of King Kong (1933).

Before shooting began, what had been envisioned as a relatively spectacular production was of necessity reined in dramatically when RKO stepped in, setting a three-week shooting schedule and a budget ceiling of $202,662 (roughly sixteen thousand less than the figure ultimately spent). Efforts to conform to these newly imposed limits were most apparent in a drastically scaled-down shipwreck sequence and in the size of the cast itself, trimmed nearly in half merely by virtue of eliminating nine of said shipwreck's victims. The eliminated actors included veterans Walter McGrail, Theodore Von Eltz, Christian Rub, Alfred Codman [sic], Cornelius Keefe, and Creighton Hale, as well as newcomers Creighton Chaney (aka Lon Chaney Jr.), Leon Waycoff (later Ames), and Ray Milland.

Reception

Box office
The film made a profit of $70,000 during its first year of release.

Critical reception
The Most Dangerous Game received mostly positive reviews from critics upon its release.

Decades later, author and film critic Leonard Maltin gave the film three out of four stars, calling it "[a v]ivid telling of Richard Connell's oft-filmed story", while British critic and encyclopaedist Leslie Halliwell likewise awarded three stars, deeming the film a "[d]ated but splendidly shivery melodrama with moments of horror and humor and mystery, and a splendidly photographed chase sequence". In addition, British magazine Time Out gave the film a positive review, praising the film's acting, and suspense, calling it "one of the best and most literate movies from the great days of horror".

Home media and colorization

The Most Dangerous Game lapsed into the public domain in 1960 and has since seen a plethora of budget releases. The first high-quality edition was via a 1995 LaserDisc from the ROAN Group. In 1999, Criterion released a restored DVD featuring an audio commentary by film historian Bruce Eder. The film was initially colorized in 1992 and again, using improved technology, in 2008 by Legend Films, who subsequently released their version on DVD alongside the B&W version.

In 2012, Flicker Alley released the film on a region-free Blu-ray; this version was restored from the original 35mm studio fine grain master by film preservationist David Shepard. The Blu-ray also included Gow the Headhunter (1931) a.k.a. Cannibal Island, an audio commentary for each film and an audio interview with Merian C. Cooper, conducted by film historian Kevin Brownlow.

Influence

The 1932 film was referenced in the plot of the David Fincher movie Zodiac (2007). Jake Gyllenhaal's character recognizes quotes from the film in letters from the Zodiac Killer sent to the newspaper office where he works.

See also
 Apocalypto, about Mayans engaging in human sacrifice and manhunts
 Bloodlust!, a similar-themed film
 The Hunt, a similar film
 The Pest, a comedy with a similar plot
 Predator (film), a similar film, same jungle terrain, man as prey
 Surviving the Game, a similar film
 Hard Target, the rich hunt the poor for sport
 List of films with a 100% rating on Rotten Tomatoes, a film review aggregator website

References

External links

 
 
 
 
 
 
The Most Dangerous Game an essay by Bruce Kawin at the Criterion Collection

1932 films
1932 directorial debut films
1932 horror films
1932 adventure films
1930s horror thriller films
American adventure drama films
American black-and-white films
American chase films
American horror films
American horror thriller films
1930s English-language films
Films based on short fiction
Films about death games
Films about hunters
Films about survivors of seafaring accidents or incidents
Films directed by Irving Pichel
Films directed by Ernest B. Schoedsack
Films scored by Max Steiner
Films set in 1932
Films set in country houses
Films set on fictional islands
RKO Pictures films
Articles containing video clips
1930s American films